A system of plant taxonomy, the Bessey system was published by Charles Bessey in 1915.

Description 
Bessey based his system on the tradition of de Candolle, Bentham and Hooker and Hallier. He was also influenced by Darwin and Wallace. He taught that taxonomy must be based on evolutionary principles. Like Wettstein he placed the Ranales at the origin of Angiospermae.

He considered Spermatophyta as having a polyphyletic origin, being composed by three different phyla, of which he only treated Anthophyta (syn.: Angiosperms). In that he used the same names for the subclasses of both monocotyledons and dicotyledons, this is contrary to contemporary rules on plant nomenclature that require names to be unique. However Bessey actually used a qualifying hyphenation (Alternifoliae-Strobiloideae and Oppositifoliae-Strobiloideae), a distinction not always recognised in reference to this scheme.  With some modifications, most modern classifications - for example, those of Cronquist (1981, 1983, 1988), Takhtajan (1969, 1980, 1983, 1991), Stebbins (1974), R. Dahlgren (1975, 1980, 1983; R. Dahlgren et al. 1981; R. Dahlgren and F. N. Rasmussen 1983; R. 
Dahlgren and K. Bremer 1985; G. Dahlgren 1989), and Thorne (1976, 1981, 1983, 1992) - follow the Bessey tradition.

Summary 
 phylum Angiospermae
1 classis Alternifoliae syn.:Monocotyledoneae
2 classis Oppositifoliae syn.: Dicotyledoneae

Alternifoliae 
1 classis Alternifoliae syn.:Monocotyledoneae   
1 subclassis Alternifoliae-Strobiloideae
ordo Alismatales
 Alismataceae
 Butomaceae
 Triuridaceae
 Scheuchzeriaceae
 Typhaceae
 Sparganiaceae
 Pandanaceae
 Aponogetonaceae
 Potamogetonaceae
ordo Liliales
 Liliaceae
 Stemonaceae
 Pontederiaceae
 Cyanastraceae
 Philydraceae
 Commelinaceae
 Xyridaceae
 Mayacaceae
 Juncaceae
 Eriocaulaceae as Eriocaulonaceae [sic]
 Thurniaceae
 Rapateaceae
 Najadaceae as Naiadaceae [sic]
ordo Arales
 Cyclanthaceae
 Araceae
 Lemnaceae
ordo Palmales
 Palmae as Palmaceae [sic]
ordo Graminales
 Restionaceae
 Centrolepidaceae
 Flagellariaceae
 Cyperaceae
 Poaceae
2 subclassis Cotyloideae
ordo Hydrales
 Vallisneriaceae syn.: Hydrocharitaceae
ordo Iridales
 Amaryllidaceae
 Haemodoraceae
 Iridaceae
 Velloziaceae
 Taccaceae
 Dioscoreaceae
 Bromeliaceae
 Musaceae
 Zingiberaceae
 Cannaceae
 Marantaceae
ordo Orchidales
 Burmanniaceae
 Orchidaceae

Oppositifoliae 
2 classis Oppositifoliae syn.: Dicotyledoneae
1 subclassis Oppositifoliae-Strobiloideae
1 superordo Apopetalae-Polycarpellatae
ordo Ranales
 Magnoliaceae
 Calycanthaceae
 Monimiaceae
 Cercidiphyllaceae
 Trochodendraceae
 Leitneriaceae
 Annonaceae as Anonaceae [sic]
 Lactoridaceae
 Gomortegaceae
 Myristicaceae
 Saururaceae
 Piperaceae
 Lacistemaceae
 Chloranthaceae
 Ranunculaceae
 Lardizabalaceae
 Berberidaceae
 Menispermaceae
 Lauraceae
 Nelumbonaceae as Nelumbaceae [sic]
 Cabombaceae
 Ceratophyllaceae
 Dilleniaceae
 Winteraceae as Winteranaceae [sic]
ordo Malvales
 Sterculiaceae
 Malvaceae
 Bombacaceae as Bombaceae [sic]
 Scytopetalaceae
 Chlaenaceae syn.: Sarcolaenaceae
 Gonystylaceae
 Tiliaceae
 Elaeocarpaceae
 Balanopaceae as Balanopsidaceae [sic]
 Ulmaceae
 Moraceae
 Urticaceae
ordo Sarraceniales
 Sarraceniaceae
 Nepenthaceae
ordo Geraniales
 Geraniaceae
 Oxalidaceae
 Tropaeolaceae
 Balsaminaceae
 Limnanthaceae
 Linaceae
 Humiriaceae
 Rutaceae
 Simaroubaceae as Simarubaceae [sic]
 Burseraceae
 Meliaceae
 Malpighiaceae
 Trigoniaceae
 Vochysiaceae
 Polygalaceae
 Tremandraceae
 Dichapetalaceae
 Euphorbiaceae
 Callitrichaceae
ordo Guttiferales
 Theaceae
 Cistaceae
 Guttiferae as Guttiferaceae [sic]
 Eucryphiaceae
 Ochnaceae
 Dipterocarpaceae
 Caryocaraceae
 Quiinaceae
 Marcgraviaceae
 Flacourtiaceae
 Bixaceae
 Cochlospermaceae
 Violaceae
 Malesherbiaceae
 Turneraceae
 Passifloraceae
 Achariaceae
 Caricaceae
 Stachyuraceae
 Koeberliniaceae
ordo Rhoedales
 Papaveraceae
 Tovariaceae
 Nymphaeaceae
 Moringaceae
 Resedaceae
 Capparaceae as Capparidaceae [sic]
 Brassicaceae
ordo Caryophyllales
 Caryophyllaceae
 Elatinaceae
 Portulacaceae
 Aizoaceae
 Frankeniaceae
 Tamaricaceae
 Salicaceae
 Podostemaceae as Podostemonaceae [sic]
 Hydrostachyaceae as Hydrostachydaceae [sic]
 Phytolaccaceae
 Basellaceae
 Amaranthaceae
 Chenopodiaceae
 Polygonaceae
 Nyctaginaceae
 Cynocrambaceae syn.: Theligonaceae
 Bataceae as Batidaceae [sic]
2 superordo Sympetalae-Polycarpellatae
ordo Ebenales
 Sapotaceae
 Ebenaceae
 Symplocaceae
 Styracaceae
 Fouquieriaceae
ordo Ericales
 Clethraceae
 Ericaceae
 Epacridaceae
 Diapensiaceae
 Pyrolaceae
 Lennoaceae
ordo Primulales
 Primulaceae
 Plantaginaceae
 Plumbaginaceae
 Myrsinaceae
 Theophrastaceae
3 superordo Sympetalae-Dicarpellatae
ordo Gentianales
 Oleaceae
 Salvadoraceae
 Loganiaceae
 Gentianaceae
 Apocynaceae
 Asclepiadaceae
ordo Polemoniales
 Polemoniaceae
 Convolvulaceae
 Hydrophyllaceae
 Boraginaceae as Borraginaceae
 Nolanaceae
 Solanaceae
ordo Scrophulariales
2 subclassis Cotyloideae
1 superordo Apopetalae
 ordo Rosales
 Rosaceae
 Malaceae
 Prunaceae
 Crossosomataceae
 Connaraceae
 Mimosaceae
 Cassiaceae
 Fabaceae
 Saxifragaceae
 Hydrangeaceae
 Grossulariaceae
 Crassulaceae
 Droseraceae
 Cephalotaceae
 Pittosporaceae
 Brunelliaceae
 Cunoniaceae
 Myrothamnaceae
 Bruniaceae
 Hamamelidaceae
 Casuarinaceae
 Eucommiaceae
 Platanaceae
 ordo Myrtales
 Lythraceae
 Sonneratiaceae
 Punicaceae
 Lecythidaceae
 Melastomataceae
 Myrtaceae
 Combretaceae
 Rhizophoraceae
 Oenotheraceae
 Halorrhagidaceae
 Hippuridaceae
 Cynomoriaceae
 Aristolochiaceae
 Rafflesiaceae
 Hydnoraceae
 ordo Loasales
 Loasaceae
 Cucurbitaceae
 Begoniaceae
 Datiscaceae
 Ancistrocladaceae
 ordo Cactales
 Cactaceae
 ordo Celastrales
 Rhamnaceae
 Vitaceae
 Celastraceae
 Buxaceae
 Aquifoliaceae
 Cyrillaceae
 Pentaphylacaceae
 Corynocarpaceae
 Hippocrateaceae
 Stackhousiaceae
 Staphyleaceae
 Geissolomataceae
 Penaeaceae
 Oliniaceae
 Thymelaeaceae
 Hernandiaceae
 Elaeagnaceae
 Myzodendraceae
 Santalaceae
 Opiliaceae
 Grubbiaceae
 Olacaceae
 Loranthaceae
 Balanophoraceae
 ordo Sapindales
 Sapindaceae
 Hippocastanaceae
 Aceraceae
 Sabiaceae
 Icacinaceae
 Melianthaceae
 Empetraceae
 Coriariaceae
 Anacardiaceae
 Juglandaceae
 Betulaceae
 Fagaceae
 Myricaceae
 Julianaceae
 Proteaceae
 ordo Apiales as Umbellales
 Araliaceae
 Apiaceae
 Cornaceae
2 superordo Sympetalae
 ordo Rubiales
 Rubiaceae
 Caprifoliaceae
 Adoxaceae
 Valerianaceae
 Dipsacaceae
 ordo Campanulales
 Campanulaceae
 Goodeniaceae
 Stylidiaceae
 Calyceraceae
 ordo Asterales
 Helianthaceae
 Ambrosiaceae
 Heleniaceae
 Arctotidaceae
 Calendulaceae
 Inulaceae
 Asteraceae
 Vernoniaceae
 Eupatoriaceae
 Anthemidaceae
 Senecionidaceae
 Carduaceae
 Mutisiaceae
 Lactucaceae

References

Bibliography 

  (also at )

system, Bessey